Rapides Cemetery is a historic burial ground located in Pineville, Louisiana at the site of the colonial era Post of Rapides.

History
The area on the bluffs has been the location of European colonial activity since 1722 and remains an active cemetery.

Colonial era
The site was the location of a simple Spanish colonial military post in 1722 or 1723. The Post du Rapide was lightly manned by the French during the French colonial period when the primary activity was trade with the Native Americans. After 1762 when France ceded Louisiana to Spain a small settlement developed around the Post El Rapido. A report to the Spanish Governor O'Reilly in 1769 found 33 whites, 18 slaves, a small Native American village of 26 men and 18 women. In 1799 the settlement had grown to a population of 760 and in 1805 it became known as Pineville. The site that was to become the Rapides Cemetery was in use at that time, known simply as the public cemetery.

After the Civil War
The Rapides Parish, Louisiana courthouse records were destroyed by fire in 1864 so records of burials before the American Civil War are not extant. In 1872 the Rapides Cemetery Association was founded to clean up, improve and maintain the cemetery. It was added to the National Register of Historic Places on June 15, 1979.

Funerary ornament
The cast iron fencing around the three significant plots in the cemetery represent an elaborate example of the use of ornamental Victorian style cast iron graveyard fences rivaling or exceeding those found in New Orleans. The Ashley plot fencing displays its tree motif not just on the gates but in the fencing all the way around the plot. The gothic gates of the Thomas–Flint–Casson plot were made in Philadelphia. T.M. Lincoln and Company of Hartford, Connecticut, manufactured the cast-iron fence for the Mead plot. This fence is composed of ovals, round arches and ball drops. The Mead plot also contains a  granite obelisk, the granite for which had to be imported.

Notable interments
 Pierre Paul Baillio (1771–1824) who built the Kent Plantation House
 Henry Boyce (1797–1873) for whom Boyce, Louisiana is named
 George M. Graham (1807–1891) "Father of Louisiana State University"
 Josiah S. Johnson (1784–1833) US Senator and Congressman

 Isaac Thomas (1784–1859) US Congressman
 John R. Thornton (1846–1917) US Senator
 James Madison Wells (1808–1899) Governor of Louisiana during Reconstruction.

References

External links

 
 
 

Cemeteries on the National Register of Historic Places in Louisiana
National Register of Historic Places in Rapides Parish, Louisiana
Protected areas of Rapides Parish, Louisiana